This is a list of notable people from Niger:

In the news

Leaders and politicians

Modern
Hama Amadou, former Prime Minister
Kalla Ankourao, former minister
Djibo Bakary, colonial premier and Sawaba party leader
Bibata Niandou Barry lawyer and minister
Hamani Diori, first President
Mahamadou Issoufou, present Leader of the Opposition, former prime minister
Ibrahim Baré Maïnassara, President, 1996-1999
Mamadou Tandja, President, 1999-2010
Hadizatou Mani, human rights advocate
Ibrahim Hassane Mayaki, former prime minister
Mamane Oumarou, Prime Minister, 1983 & 1989
Mahamane Ousmane, President, 1993-1996
Ali Saibou, President, 1987-1993
André Salifou, professor and opposition leader
Ilguilas Weila, human rights activist
Seyni Oumarou, present prime minister
Ousmane Issoufou Oubandawaki, former Minister of National Defence, former Minister of Transports, former Director General of ASECNA

Not served or opposition
 Rhissa Ag Boula

Military Leaders
Seyni Kountché, military officer, President 1974-1987
Général Ali Saïbou, military officer, President 1987-1992
Daouda Malam Wanké, military officer, President 1999-2000

Religious figures
Sarraounia: Mauri religious leader
Ambroise Ouédraogo: Roman Catholic Archbishop of Maradi

Other
Emaniel Djibril Dankawa, footballer
Mariam Kamara, architect

See also
List of Nigerien writers
List of people by nationality

Niger
 
People
Niger